A puja thali is a tray or large container on which puja materials are accumulated and decorated. On Hindu religious occasions, festivals, traditions and rituals, the puja thali maintains an auspicious role. A puja thali may be made of steel, gold, silver, brass, or any other metal; it may be rounded, oval, or any other shaped or with little engravings and other decorations.

Materials
The following materials must be in a puja thali :
 Turmeric paste/sindura (Vermilion) paste/Rangoli color for holy symbols like 'Om', 'Swastika' etc.
 Akshata (unbroken rice grains).
 Diyas and incense sticks (Agarwood).
 Coconuts
 Flowers (marigolds, roses, and various designs with single color petals or a combination of different colors).
 Prasadam.
 Holy water in a container.
Along with these, a ghanta (bell), a conch (Shankha), a kalasha (holy pitcher) with holy water, ghee, camphor, betel-leaves, tulasi, milk, fresh fruits, sandalwood-paste, kumkuma, murti (earthen images) of deities and gold or silver coins may be include as needed.

Variations
On the occasion of Deepavali, more than one diya might be arranged on thali; on Raksha Bandhan, a rakhi may be added. Bael-leaves and datura flowers are included in the thali for the Mahashivaratri festival.

References

External links 

Worship
Hindu rituals